The threadfin catfish, also known as the copper catfish or the northern pout, (Nemapteryx armiger) is a species of catfish in the family Ariidae. It was described by Charles Walter De Vis in 1884, originally under the genus Arius. It is found in rivers and marine waters in Australia and New Guinea. Its diet consists of benthic crustaceans including prawns and crabs, as well as worms, mollusks and finfish.

References

Ariidae
Fish described in 1884